Anthony Abidemi Lokosa (born 5 May 1997) is a Nigerian footballer who plays as a winger for Spanish side Almería B.

Club career
Born in Lagos, Lokosa played for local sides Everlastingstars FC, Crown and 36 Lion FC before moving abroad in 2016, joining Israeli Premier League side Beitar Tel Aviv Bat Yam on a one-year loan deal. He made his professional debut on 19 August of that year, starting in a 1–1 away draw against Maccabi Sha'arayim.

Lokosa scored his first professional goal on 30 September 2016, netting the opener in a 2–1 home win over Maccabi Herzliya. After five goals in 24 appearances, he was bought by Pharco FC of the Egyptian Second Division in 2017.

In August 2019, Lokosa was loaned to Egyptian Premier League side Haras El Hodoud for the entire 2019–20 season. Upon returning to Pharco, he helped the side on their first-ever promotion to the top tier.

On 23 September 2021, Lokosa moved to Europe and joined UD Almería on loan, being assigned to the B-team in Tercera División RFEF.

Personal life
Lokosa's older brother Junior is also a footballer. A forward, he represented Nigeria internationally once.

References

External links

1997 births
Living people
Sportspeople from Lagos
Nigerian footballers
Association football wingers
Israeli Premier League players
Beitar Tel Aviv Bat Yam F.C. players
Egyptian Premier League players
Egyptian Second Division players
Pharco FC players
Haras El Hodoud SC players
Tercera Federación players
UD Almería B players
Nigerian expatriate footballers
Nigerian expatriate sportspeople in Israel
Nigerian expatriate sportspeople in Egypt
Nigerian expatriate sportspeople in Spain
Expatriate footballers in Israel
Expatriate footballers in Egypt
Expatriate footballers in Spain